Diuris eborensis is a species of orchid which is endemic to eastern Australia. It has up to six grass-like leaves and a flowering stem with up to four pale yellowish flowers with dark reddish purple streaks.

Description
The flowers are pale yellowish with dark reddish-purple streaks and striations and lean slightly forwards. Flowering occurs from October to early December and the fruit which follows is a dehiscent capsule containing up to 500 seeds.

Taxonomy and naming
Diuris eborensis was first formally described in 2006 by David Jones and the description was published in Australian Orchid Research from a specimen collected near Rigney Creek, west of Ebor.

Distribution and habitat
This donkey orchid grows in moist, grassy places near streams in five locations on the New England Tableland.

Conservation
Diuris eborensis is listed as "endangered" under the New South Wales Threatened Species Conservation Act 1995 and has been recommended for listing as "endangered" under the Australian Government Environment Protection and Biodiversity Conservation Act 1999. The main threats to the species include grazing and trampling by cattle, competition from weeds, camping, roadworks and dumping of waste.

References

eborensis
Endemic orchids of Australia
Flora of New South Wales
Plants described in 2006